David Robertson Adams (14 May 1883 – 29 November 1948) was a Scottish footballer who played as a goalkeeper for Celtic at the start of the 20th century.

Career
Born in Angus but raised largely in the Falkirk area, Adams joined Celtic near the end of 1902 from Junior side Dunipace, and made his first appearance in September 1903 in a 1-0 win over Hibernian at Celtic Park. He went on to play 291 Scottish Football League and Scottish Cup games for Celtic in a nine-year spell at the club, and was the last goalkeeper at the club to wear green-and-white hoops in games; after a rule change in 1910 specifying goalkeepers must wear a different colour, he wore a yellow jersey. Adams was a virtual ever-present in what is regarded as the first truly great Celtic side that won six consecutive Scottish League titles from 1904–05 to 1909–10.

At the start of the 1906–07 season, Adams cut his hand during a benefit match at Ibrox Stadium. The mishap was caused by a nail which had been inserted through a goal-post for a five-a-side tournament. This incident precipitated the first known transfer between the two Old Firm clubs: Rangers' reserve goalkeeper Tom Sinclair was loaned to Celtic to cover for Adams's injury, and he went on to pick up a Glasgow Cup winner's medal with the Parkhead club.

Adams retired in 1912, settling in the East Lothian area.

Honours
Celtic
Scottish League: 1904–05, 1905–06, 1906–07, 1907–08, 1908–09, 1909–10
Scottish Cup: 1903–04, 1906–07, 1907–08, 1910–11
Glasgow Cup: 1904–05, 1905–06, 1907–08

References 
Celtic: A complete record 1888-1992 by Paul Lunney

1883 births
1948 deaths
Association football goalkeepers
Celtic F.C. players
Footballers from Angus, Scotland
Scottish Football League players
Scottish footballers
Scottish Junior Football Association players
20th-century Scottish people
Dunipace F.C. players
Scotland junior international footballers
Footballers from Falkirk (council area)